Calders is a municipality in Catalonia, Spain

Calders may also refer to:
Calders (Yorkshire Dales), hill in England
The Calders, housing estate in Edinburgh, Scotland
East Calder, Mid Calder and West Calder, towns in West Lothian, Scotland; "The Calders"

See also
Calder (disambiguation)